Jeff Wittenberg (born 19 March 1973) is an Australian former professional rugby league footballer who played in England and Australia. His father, John, was an Australian international.

Playing career
Wittenberg began his career playing for the Wynnum Manly Seagulls, a club who his father had also represented. In 1993 he signed with the St. George Dragons, another of his fathers former clubs. Wittenberg only made one appearance for the club and left at the end of the season.

In 1995 Wittenberg joined the new South Queensland Crushers franchise and played in their inaugural match on 11 March 1995. He spent two seasons at the club. In 1997, despite interest from Castleford, Wittenberg signed with the Bradford Bulls for 1997's Super League II. He only remained one season with the Bulls, joining the Huddersfield Giants in 1998. At the end of the 1998 season Wittenberg was released.

Wittenberg spent several years in the lower grades, playing for the Sheffield Eagles and then the Batley Bulldogs. Wittenberg then returned to Huddersfield, playing for the club in the 2002 and 2003 seasons.

References

External links
Huddersfield RL Heritage

Living people
Australian rugby league players
1973 births
St. George Dragons players
South Queensland Crushers players
Bradford Bulls players
Huddersfield Giants players
Sheffield Eagles players
Batley Bulldogs players
Rugby league props
Rugby league second-rows
Wynnum Manly Seagulls players